Acianthera quadricristata is a species of orchid plant native to Ecuador.

References 

quadricristata
Flora of Ecuador